The clown toado (Canthigaster callisterna) a pufferfish of the genus Canthigaster, is found in the southwest Pacific Ocean including  Australia, the northeast coast of New Zealand, and New Caledonia. Its length is between 10 and 20 cm.

The clown toado, like other puffers, is highly poisonous.

References
 
 
 Tony Ayling & Geoffrey Cox, Collins Guide to the Sea Fishes of New Zealand,  (William Collins Publishers Ltd, Auckland, New Zealand 1982) 
 Shao, K., Liu, M., Jing, L., Hardy, G., Leis, J.L. & Matsuura, K. 2014. Canthigaster callisterna. The IUCN Red List of Threatened Species 2014: e.T193709A2263843. https://dx.doi.org/10.2305/IUCN.UK.2014-3.RLTS.T193709A2263843.en. Accessed on 09 April 2022.

callisterna 
Fish described in 1889